Tuyin was one of the top four generals in the service of King Swa Saw Ke of Ava. Although the royal chronicles list him as Number 3 of the top senior generals, they mention him in only one war, Mohnyin–Ava War (1392–93). The career cavalry corps officer apparently was a non-royal, and was conspicuously absent in the chronicles' commander lists for the Forty Years' War, which he must have participated. He commanded the elephant corps in the first part of the Mohnyin war, and he was roundly defeated near Myedu. He later switched back to his natural cavalry corps, and under the overall command of Thilawa of Yamethin the Ava army decisively defeated the Mohnyin army outside Sagaing in 1393.

References

Bibliography
 
 

Burmese generals